The Eastern Mennonite Royals (also EMU Royals) are the athletic teams that represent Eastern Mennonite University, located in Harrisonburg, Virginia, in NCAA Division III intercollegiate sports. The Royals compete as full, non-football members of the Old Dominion Athletic Conference. In men's volleyball, a sport not sponsored by the ODAC, EMU competes in the Continental Volleyball Conference. Altogether, Eastern Mennonite sponsors 16 sports: 7 for men and 9 for women.

Varsity teams

List of teams

Men's sports
 Baseball
 Basketball
 Cross Country
 Disc Golf
 Soccer
 Track & Field
 Volleyball

Women's sports
 Basketball
 Cross Country
 Field Hockey
 Lacrosse
 Soccer
 Softball
 Track & Field
 Triathlon
 Volleyball

Individual teams

Basketball
At the end of the 2009–10 season EMU's men's basketball team had 25–5 record and was ranked No. 4 in the nation by D3hoops.com.

Softball
In the spring of 2010, women's softball entered in the ODAC tournament as the 8th seed team. They advanced to the championship game and defeated Virginia Wesleyan 5–1 to become the 2010 ODAC champions, advancing to the D-III national softball tournament for the first time in school history.

References

External links